Kilij Arslan ibn Suleiman (or Kılıcarslan,  "Sword Lion") (‎1079–1107) was the Seljuq Sultan of Rum from 1092 until his death in 1107. He ruled the Sultanate during the time of the First Crusade and thus faced the attack. He also re-established the Sultanate of Rum after the death of Malik Shah I of the Seljuk Empire and defeated the Crusaders in three battles during the Crusade of 1101. Kilij Arslan was the first Muslim and Turkish commander to fight against the Crusaders, commanding his horse archers while a teenager.

Rise to power
After the death of his father, Suleyman, in 1086, he became a hostage of Sultan Malik Shah I of Great Seljuq in Isfahan, but was released when Malik Shah died in 1092 in the wake of a quarrel among his jailers. Kilij Arslan then marched at the head of the Turkish Oghuz Yiva tribe army and set up his capital at Nicaea, replacing Amin 'l Ghazni, the governor appointed by Malik Shah I.

Following the death of Malik Shah I the individual tribes, the Danishmends, Mangujekids, Saltuqids, Tengribirmish begs, Artuqids (Ortoqids) and Akhlat-Shahs, had started vying with each other to establish their own independent states. Alexius Comnenus's Byzantine intrigues further complicated the situation. He married Ayşe Hatun, the daughter of the Emir Tzachas to attempt to ally himself against the Byzantines, who commanded a strong naval fleet. They had four sons: Malik Shah, Mesud I, Arab and Toghrul. In 1094, Kilij Arslan received a letter from Alexius suggesting that the Tzachas sought to target him to move onto the Byzantines, thereupon Kilij Arslan marched with an army to Smyrna, Tzachas's capital, and invited his father-in-law to a banquet in his tent where he slew him while he was intoxicated.

The Crusades

People's Crusade

The People's Crusade (also called the Peasants' Crusade) army of Peter the Hermit and Walter the Penniless arrived at Nicaea in 1096. A German contingent of the crusade overran the castle Xerigordon and held it until Kilij sent a force to starve them out. Those that renounced Christianity were spared and sent into captivity to the east, the rest were put to death. Kilij Arslan also cunningly sent spies to trick the Crusaders into thinking Xerigordon was ripe for the taking, and the ill-disciplined Crusaders rushed to Xerigordon despite orders against this. They were consequently ambushed, forcing Peter the Hermit to eventually give up the crusade.

The remainder of Peter's crusade composed almost entirely of unarmed civilians was surprised near the village of Civetot by Kilij Arslan's army. They were easily overwhelmed and around 17,000 out of the 20,000 remaining Christians died. He then invaded the Danishmend Emirate of Malik Ghazi in eastern Anatolia.

The First Crusade would start a few months later.

First Crusade

Because of this easy first victory he did not consider the main crusader army, led by various nobles of western Europe, to be a serious threat. He resumed his war with the Danishmends, and was away from Nicaea when these new Crusaders besieged Nicaea in May 1097. He hurried back to his capital to find it surrounded by the Crusaders, and was defeated in battle with them on 21 May. The city then surrendered to the Byzantines and his wife and children were captured. When the crusaders sent the Sultan to Constantinople, to their dismay she was later returned without ransom in 1097 because of the relationship between Kilij Arslan and Alexios I Komnenos.

As result of the stronger invasion, Rum and the Danismends allied in their attempt to turn back the crusaders. The Crusaders continued to split their forces as they marched across Anatolia. The combined Danishmend and Rum forces planned to ambush the Crusaders near Dorylaeum on 29 June. However, Kilij Arslan's horse archers could not penetrate the line of defense set up by the Crusader knights, and the main body under Bohemond arrived to capture the Turkish camp on 1 July. In this battle, the Kilij Arslan and his troops won the respect of his enemy, as the Gesta Francorum states: "had the Turks been Christian, they would be the finest of all races."

Kilij Arslan was defeated and settled for harassing the Crusader army with guerilla warfare and hit-and-run tactics. He also destroyed crops and water sources along their route in order to hinder the Crusader Army from collecting supplies, ultimately with little success.

Crusade of 1101

Gazi Gümüshtigin captured Bohemond resulting in a new force of Lombards attempting to rescue him. In their march they took Ankara from Arslan upon the Danishmends. In alliance with Radwan the Atabeg of Aleppo he ambushed this force at the Battle of Mersivan. In 1101 he defeated another Crusader army at Heraclea Cybistra, which had come to assist the fledgling Crusader states in Syria. This was an important victory for the Turks, as it proved that an army of Crusader knights was not invincible. After this victory he moved his capital to Konya and defeated a force led by William II of Nevers who attempted to march upon it as well as the subsequent force a week later.

In 1104 he resumed his war with the Danishmends who were now weakened after the death of Malik Ghazi, demanding half the ransom gained for Bohemond. As a result, Bohemond allied with the Danishmends against Rum and the Byzantines.

War and drowning in river
After the crusades he moved towards the east, taking Harran and Diyarbakr. In 1107 he conquered Mosul, but he was defeated by Muhammad I Tapar supported by Ilghazi of the Artuqids and Fakhr al-Mulk Radwan of Aleppo at the battle of Khabur River. Having lost the battle, Kilij Arslan drowned trying to escape across the river.

Discovery of his burial
In January 2021, archaeologists led by professor Ahmet Tanyıldız from the Dicle University claimed to discover his and his daughter Saide Hatun's grave in Silvan, Diyarbakır. Researchers dug two metres deep across a 35-square-metre area and focused their works on two gravesites in Orta Çeşme Park.

References

Sources

1079 births
1107 deaths
Sultans of Rum
Deaths by drowning
Muslims of the First Crusade
Muslims of the Crusade of 1101
Year of birth unknown
11th-century Turkic people